Head of State (Armenian: Առաջին Դեմք) is an Armenian comedy written by Narek Margaryan and Sergey Sargsyan and directed by Hrant Yeritskinyan, starring Aram Mp3, Sati Janibekyan, Narek Margaryan, Sergey Sargsyan and David Tadevosyan. The film was completed in 2016 and, was released on April 1, 2016.

Premise
An unemployed journalist keeps blaming everyone but himself for problems in his love life and bad policies of the country only to find out what he can change when he becomes the President.

Cast
 Aram Mp3 as Grigor Astvatsatryan
 David Tadevosyan as Hovsep
 Sati Janibekyan as Liza
 Narek Margaryan as Vardan Ananyan
 Sergey Sargsyan as Vardan Begloyan
 Anna Grigoryan as Lilith
 Ara Deghtriqyan as Vrezh Kostandyan
 Arsen Grigoryan
 Levon Haroutyunyan

References

External links

 Article on Hrant Yeritskinyan, The Armenian Times 8/12/2015
 Official website
 Head of State | Official Trailer on YouTube

Armenian comedy films
2016 comedy films
Films shot in Armenia
2016 films